Governor Bond may refer to:

Kit Bond (born 1939), 47th and 49th Governor of Missouri
Shadrach Bond (1773–1832), 1st Governor of Illinois